Broad Group is a private manufacturer of central air conditioning non-electric absorption chillers that are powered by natural gas and waste heat based in Changsha, China. It is also the parent company of Broad Sustainable Building, a prefab building company. The company was established in 1996 and exports products to over 60 countries. It was Shanghai Expo 2010's only global official partner that was a Chinese private enterprise and the exclusive supplier of central air conditioning, ventilation and air purification products for the event.

Broad is one of the few Chinese manufacturing companies that has been widely recognized for its green policies and commitment to countering climate change. It has expanded its business in recent years to include other energy saving products and sustainable buildings through its subsidiary Broad Sustainable Building, and achieved the feat of building a 15-story tall hotel in six days, which received two million views in the first ten days after being released on YouTube. More recently, the firm succeeded in erecting a 30-story hotel in 15 days.

History

1988–1992: The early years
Born in Changsha in 1960, Zhang Yue was unable to attend school until he was nine years old thanks to the Cultural Revolution, which temporarily shut down most schools in the country. 

He worked as a librarian and teaching drawing at primary school.

He founded Broad in 1988, registering the company in Chenzhou, Hunan province. Using his savings of $3000, Broad developed industrial boilers based on Zhang's patented design. In the 1980s, most domestically manufactured boilers were of poor quality and had high risk of exploding, while Broad's did not. 

His current wealth is estimated at $1.5 billion.

1992–2005: Move to Changsha and rise
In 1992, the company was moved to Changsha and began manufacturing absorption chillers. At the time, the government provided incentives for non-electric chillers to relieve strain on the national electricity grid, contributing to the company's rise as it became the global leader in absorption chiller by sales in 1996; it entered the international market in 1998 and today, its sales in domestic and international markets split evenly.

2005–present: From manufacturing to sustainable construction
While absorption chillers remain Broad's largest source of revenue, it now offers other environmentally friendly products including air purifiers and air conditioner terminals, with the BSB (Broad Sustainable Building) its latest invention in sustainable building technology, receiving more attention.

2012: Sky City One
BSB, the building construction subsidiary of Broad group, announced plans to build Sky City One, the world's tallest tower, with a height of 838 m. The announcement made headlines not only for the size of the tower, but also for an audacious construction plan that involved completion in just 90 days.

In 2015, BSB built a 57-storey Mini Sky City that stands at a height of 204 m. The construction of the tower took just 19 days. The Tower was built using pre-manufactured steel modules which are also going to be used in construction of the Sky City One.

2016: SkyCity Challenge
In 2016 SkyCity Challenge a biannual architectural design Challenge is formed by the support of Broad Group. The series started by launching “SkyCity Challenge 17” with over 400 registered teams from around the globe. The aim of the challenge was to design the interior atriums of the 57-storey Mini Sky City.

Innovations
Invented in 2009, the BSB achieves high energy efficiency and carbon reduction primarily through thermal insulation, preventing cool air from leaving indoors and hot air from coming in from outdoors when the weather is hot and vice versa when the weather is cold, and requires short construction time since parts are pre-fabricated in factories and assembled onsite. At the 2010 United Nations Climate Change Conference, President of Mexico, Felipe Calderón, called the BSB technology "a practical, imaginative, creative & bold endeavor and a new revolution of world's architectural and housing industry", which is bound to be transferred to developing countries leading to reduction in carbon emissions. BSB has also been tested to be able to resist a 9.0 magnitude earthquake and was recommended in a United Nations Environment Program report on the rebuilding of Sichuan after its catastrophic earthquake in 2008.

Broad Sustainable Building 

So far, Broad has built four demos of BSB, including the six-story Broad Pavilion in Shanghai Expo 2010 in one day, the 14-story New Ark's Hotel in Broad's headquarters in six days, the Broad Pavilion in 2010 United Nations Climate Change Conference in eight days, and a 30-story hotel prototype near Dongting lake in 15 days.

Environmental record

Awards and recognition
In May 2011, Broad's founder and chairman, Zhang Yue, was awarded the Champions of the Earth Award (Entrepreneurial Vision Category) by the United Nations Environment Programme for Broad's commitment to climate change. It was one of the ten companies to be recognized by the BusinessWeek Greener China Business Awards in 2009. It was also named one of the "20 Most Admired Companies in China" in 2001, ’02, ’04, and ’05 by China's Economic Observer and Peking University.

Refusing to invest in electric chiller market
In 2000, amid temporary company sales drop, and huge demands for cooling equipment of all kinds in China, Zhang was urged to enter the much larger market for electric air conditioners. Zhang refused, citing that after successfully challenging himself to create wealth when the company was started, his current only motive was to "save energy and reduce greenhouse emissions." A Carnegie Council article cited a 2004 Peking University–Richard Ivey School of Business case study on Zhang's decision and reports "the authors argue that Broad would likely have gained 'a significant market share' and earned '10 times' its production cost in this product area—but in doing so it would not have been able to 'stay true to the company's environmental protection principles.'"

Global involvement 
Broad has been a member of the United Nations Global Compact since 2001. In October 2008, Broad formally joined The Climate Group, being among the first group of Chinese global members.

References

External links
 Official site
 Official US site

Construction and civil engineering companies of China
Companies based in Changsha
Manufacturing companies established in 1988
Chinese companies established in 1988
Sustainable building
Chinese brands
Construction and civil engineering companies established in 1988